This is a list of Croatian television related events from 1966.

Events

Debuts

Television shows

Ending this year

Births
16 January - Boris Mirković actor & TV host
9 July - Robert Ferlin, radio host
13 September - Davor Dretar Drele, TV & radio host, actor & singer

Deaths